The 2000 Davidoff Swiss Indoors was a tennis tournament played on indoor carpet courts at the St. Jakobshalle in Basel in Switzerland and was part of the International Series of the 2001 ATP Tour. The tournament ran from 24 October through 29 October 2000. Second-seeded Thomas Enqvist won the singles title.

Finals

Singles

 Thomas Enqvist defeated  Roger Federer 6–2, 4–6, 7–6(7–4), 1–6, 6–1
 It was Enqvist's 2nd title of the year and the 18th of his career.

Doubles

 Donald Johnson /  Piet Norval defeated  Roger Federer /  Dominik Hrbatý 7–6(11–9), 4–6, 7–6(7–4)
 It was Johnson's 4th title of the year and the 13th of his career. It was Norval's 3rd title of the year and the 13th of his career.

References

External links
 Official website 
 ATP tournament profile

 
Davidoff Swiss Indoors
Swiss Indoors